Back to the Country is the twenty-fifth solo studio album by American country music singer-songwriter Loretta Lynn. It was released on February 3, 1975, by MCA Records.

The album's single, "The Pill", a controversial song about birth control, brought Lynn much notoriety in the media and was banned on a number of radio stations, although the single was reportedly her best selling of the decade.

Critical reception

In the February 15, 1975 issue, Billboard published a review that said, "Is this the Loretta we know? Singing about "The Pill" (her runaway hit single), a barroom fight, skinny dipping, sharing a bed and other such infidelities. It's down to earth country, and no one can sing that sort of song the way Loretta does it. The only amazing thing about it is that she doesn't sing a single one of her own songs. But she does others, including those previously performed by Marie Osmond, Billy Swan, Cal Smith, and a turn-around-version of a Conway Twitty hit."

Cashbox also published a review in their February 15 issue which said, "Loretta Lynn will always be No. 1 among her fans and with the chart positions she holds. Each release, single or LP, hits the same for her and MCA. Another fine collection including "Will You Be There", "Paper Roses", "Mad Mrs. Jesse Brown", "Back to the Country", "I Can Help", and lots more good country cuts. Loretta never left the country, but we like the "back to."

Commercial performance 
The album peaked at No. 2 on the US Billboard Hot Country LPs chart and No. 182 on the Billboard Top LP's and Tape chart. 

The album's only single, "The Pill", was released in January 1975 and peaked at No. 5 on the US Billboard Hot Country Singles chart and No. 70 on the US Billboard Hot 100, despite being banned by a number of radio stations. The single was also successful in Canada, where it peaked at No. 1 on the RPM Country Singles chart and No. 49 on the RPM Top Singles chart.

Recording 
Recording sessions for the album began on August 29, 1974, at Bradley's Barn in Mount Juliet, Tennessee. Three additional sessions followed on December 17,  18, and 19. Three songs on the album were from recording sessions for previous albums. "The Pill" and "The Hands of Yesterday" were recorded during the December 12, 1972 session for 1973's Entertainer of the Year. "Paper Roses" was recorded on March 4, 1974, during a session for 1974's They Don't Make 'Em Like My Daddy.

Track listing

Personnel 
Adapted from the album liner notes.
Bobby Bradley – engineer
Owen Bradley – producer
Harold Bradley – electric guitar, bass guitar
Ray Edenton – rhythm guitar
Vic Gabany – engineer
Johnny Gimble – fiddle
Bud Gray – photography
Buddy Harman – drums
The Jordanaires – background vocals
Millie Kirkham – background vocals
Billy Linneman – bass
Loretta Lynn – lead vocals
Grady Martin – lead electric guitar
Charlie McCoy – harmonica
Bob Moore – bass
Joe Mills – engineer
Hargus "Pig" Robbins – piano
Hal Rugg – steel guitar
Jerry Smith – piano
Pete Wade – rhythm guitar

Charts

Weekly charts 
Album

Year-end charts

Singles

References 

1975 albums
Loretta Lynn albums
Albums produced by Owen Bradley
MCA Records albums